South Carolina Highway 20 Connector may refer to:

South Carolina Highway 20 Connector (Abbeville)
South Carolina Highway 20 Connector (Craytonville)

020 Connector
020 Connector